Michael Norell (born 31 August 1960) is a Swedish weightlifter. He competed in the men's lightweight event at the 1984 Summer Olympics.

References

1960 births
Living people
Swedish male weightlifters
Olympic weightlifters of Sweden
Weightlifters at the 1984 Summer Olympics
Sportspeople from Stockholm
20th-century Swedish people